Megaloptidia is a genus of bees belonging to the family Halictidae.

The species of this genus are found in Southern America.

Species:

Megaloptidia contradicta 
Megaloptidia nocturna 
Megaloptidia saulensis

References

Halictidae